Rapid transit or mass rapid transit (MRT), also known as heavy rail or metro, is a type of high-capacity public transport generally found in urban areas. A rapid transit system that primarily or traditionally runs below the surface may be called a subway, tube,  or underground. Unlike buses or trams, rapid transit systems are railways (usually electric) that operate on an exclusive right-of-way, which cannot be accessed by pedestrians or other vehicles, and which is often grade-separated in tunnels or on elevated railways.

Modern services on rapid transit systems are provided on designated lines between stations typically using electric multiple units on rail tracks, although some systems use guided rubber tires, magnetic levitation (maglev), or monorail. The stations typically have high platforms, without steps inside the trains, requiring custom-made trains in order to minimize gaps between train and platform. They are typically integrated with other public transport and often operated by the same public transport authorities. However, some rapid transit systems have at-grade intersections between a rapid transit line and a road or between two rapid transit lines.

The world's first rapid transit system was the partially underground Metropolitan Railway which opened in 1863 using steam locomotives, and now forms part of the London Underground. In 1868, New York opened the elevated West Side and Yonkers Patent Railway, initially a cable-hauled line using static steam engines.

The world's longest single-operator rapid transit system by route length is the Shanghai Metro. The world's largest single rapid transit service provider by number of stations (472 stations in total) is the New York City Subway. The three busiest rapid transit systems in the world by annual ridership are the Shanghai Metro, Tokyo subway system and the Moscow Metro.

Terminology

Metro is the most common term for underground rapid transit systems used by non-native English speakers. Rapid transit systems may be named after the medium by which passengers travel in busy central business districts; the use of tunnels inspires names such as subway, underground, Untergrundbahn (U-Bahn) in German, or the Tunnelbana (T-bana) in Swedish; the use of viaducts inspires names such as elevated (L or el), skytrain, overhead, overground or Hochbahn in German. One of these terms may apply to an entire system, even if a large part of the network (for example, in outer suburbs) runs at ground level.

In most of Britain, a subway is a pedestrian underpass; the terms Underground and Tube are used for the London Underground, and the North East England Tyne and Wear Metro, mostly overground, is known as the Metro. In Scotland, however, the Glasgow Subway underground rapid transit system is known as the Subway. 

Various terms are used for rapid transit systems around North America. The term metro is a shortened reference to a metropolitan area. Rapid transit systems such as the Washington Metro, Los Angeles Metro Rail, the Miami Metrorail, and the Montreal Metro are generally called the Metro. In Philadelphia, the term “El” is used for the Market–Frankford Line which runs mostly on an elevated track, while the term “subway” applies to the Broad Street Line which is almost entirely underground.Chicago's commuter rail system that serves the entire metropolitan area is called Metra (short for "Metropolitan Rail"), while its rapid transit system that serves the city is called the "L". Boston's subway system is known locally as "The T", while in the San Francisco Bay Area, residents refer to Bay Area Rapid Transit by its acronym "BART".

The New York City Subway is referred to simply as “the subway”, despite 40% of the system running above ground. The term “L” or “El” is not used for elevated lines in general as the lines in the system are already designated with letters and numbers. The “L” train or L (New York City Subway service) refers specifically to the 14th Street–Canarsie Local line, and not other elevated trains. 

In most of Southeast Asia and in Taiwan, rapid transit systems are primarily known by the acronym MRT. The meaning however varies from one country to another. In Indonesia, the acronym stands for Moda Raya Terpadu or Integrated Mass [Transit] Mode in English. In the Philippines, it stands for Metro Rail Transit, with two lines also using the term subway being underground lines. In Thailand, it stands for Metropolitan Rapid Transit, and previously also used the Mass Rapid Transit name. Outside of Southeast Asia, Kaohsiung and Taoyuan, Taiwan have their own MRT systems which also stands for Mass Rapid Transit as with Singapore.

History

The opening of London's steam-hauled Metropolitan Railway in 1863 marked the beginning of rapid transit. Initial experiences with steam engines, despite ventilation, were unpleasant. Experiments with pneumatic railways failed in their extended adoption by cities. Electric traction was more efficient, faster and cleaner than steam and the natural choice for trains running in tunnels and proved superior for elevated services.

In 1890, the City & South London Railway was the first electric-traction rapid transit railway, which was also fully underground. Prior to opening, the line was to be called the "City and South London Subway", thus introducing the term Subway into railway terminology. Both railways, alongside others, were eventually merged into London Underground. The 1893 Liverpool Overhead Railway was designed to use electric traction from the outset.

The technology quickly spread to other cities in Europe, the United States, Argentina, and Canada, with some railways being converted from steam and others being designed to be electric from the outset. Budapest, Chicago, Glasgow and New York City all converted or purpose-designed and built electric rail services.

Advancements in technology have allowed new automated services. Hybrid solutions have also evolved, such as tram-train and premetro, which incorporate some of the features of rapid transit systems. In response to cost, engineering considerations and topological challenges some cities have opted to construct tram systems, particularly those in Australia, where density in cities was low and suburbs tended to spread out. Since the 1970s, the viability of underground train systems in Australian cities, particularly Sydney and Melbourne, has been reconsidered and proposed as a solution to over-capacity. Melbourne had tunnels and stations developed in the 1970s and opened in 1980. The first line of Sydney Metro, was opened in 2019.

Since the 1960s, many new systems were introduced in Europe, Asia and Latin America. In the 21st century, most new expansions and systems are located in Asia, with China becoming the world's leader in metro expansion, operating some of the largest and busiest systems while possessing almost 60 cities that are operating, constructing or planning a rapid transit system.

Operation
Rapid transit is used in cities, agglomerations, and metropolitan areas to transport large numbers of people often short distances at high frequency. The extent of the rapid transit system varies greatly between cities, with several transport strategies.

Some systems may extend only to the limits of the inner city, or to its inner ring of suburbs with trains making frequent station stops. The outer suburbs may then be reached by a separate commuter rail network where more widely spaced stations allow higher speeds. In some cases the differences between urban rapid transit and suburban systems are not clear.

Rapid transit systems may be supplemented by other systems such as trolleybuses, regular buses, trams, or commuter rail. This combination of transit modes serves to offset certain limitations of rapid transit such as limited stops and long walking distances between outside access points. Bus or tram feeder systems transport people to rapid transit stops.

Lines

Each rapid transit system consists of one or more lines, or circuits. Each line is serviced by at least one specific route with trains stopping at all or some of the line's stations. Most systems operate several routes, and distinguish them by colors, names, numbering, or a combination thereof. Some lines may share track with each other for a portion of their route or operate solely on their own right-of-way. Often a line running through the city center forks into two or more branches in the suburbs, allowing a higher service frequency in the center. This arrangement is used by many systems, such as the Copenhagen Metro, the Milan Metro, the Oslo Metro, the Istanbul Metro and the New York City Subway.

Alternatively, there may be a single central terminal (often shared with the central railway station), or multiple interchange stations between lines in the city center, for instance in the Prague Metro. The London Underground and Paris Métro are densely built systems with a matrix of crisscrossing lines throughout the cities. The Chicago 'L' has most of its lines converging on The Loop, the main business, financial, and cultural area. Some systems have a circular line around the city center connecting to radially arranged outward lines, such as the Moscow Metro's Koltsevaya Line and Beijing Subway's Line 10.

The capacity of a line is obtained by multiplying the car capacity, the train length, and the service frequency. Heavy rapid transit trains might have six to twelve cars, while lighter systems may use four or fewer. Cars have a capacity of 100 to 150 passengers, varying with the seated to standing ratio—more standing gives higher capacity. The minimum time interval between trains is shorter for rapid transit than for mainline railways owing to the use of Communications based train control: the minimum headway can reach 90 seconds, but many systems typically use 120 seconds to allow for recovery from delays. Typical capacity lines allow 1,200 people per train, giving 36,000 passengers per hour per direction. However, much higher capacities are attained in East Asia with ranges of 75,000 to 85,000 people per hour achieved by MTR Corporation's urban lines in Hong Kong.

Network topologies

Rapid transit topologies are determined by a large number of factors, including geographical barriers, existing or expected travel patterns, construction costs, politics, and historical constraints. A transit system is expected to serve an area of land with a set of lines, which consist of shapes summarized as "I", "L", "U", "S", and "O" shapes or loops. Geographical barriers may cause chokepoints where transit lines must converge (for example, to cross a body of water), which are potential congestion sites but also offer an opportunity for transfers between lines. Ring lines provide good coverage, connect between the radial lines and serve tangential trips that would otherwise need to cross the typically congested core of the network. A rough grid pattern can offer a wide variety of routes while still maintaining reasonable speed and frequency of service. A study of the 15 world largest subway systems suggested a universal shape composed of a dense core with branches radiating from it.

Passenger information

Rapid transit operators have often built up strong brands, often focused on easy recognition—to allow quick identification even in the vast array of signage found in large cities—combined with the desire to communicate speed, safety, and authority. In many cities, there is a single corporate image for the entire transit authority, but the rapid transit uses its own logo that fits into the profile.

A transit map is a topological map or schematic diagram used to show the routes and stations in a public transport system. The main components are color-coded lines to indicate each line or service, with named icons to indicate stations. Maps may show only rapid transit or also include other modes of public transport. Transit maps can be found in transit vehicles, on platforms, elsewhere in stations, and in printed timetables. Maps help users understand the interconnections between different parts of the system; for example, they show the interchange stations where passengers can transfer between lines. Unlike conventional maps, transit maps are usually not geographically accurate, but emphasize the topological connections among the different stations. The graphic presentation may use straight lines and fixed angles, and often a fixed minimum distance between stations, to simplify the display of the transit network. Often this has the effect of compressing the distance between stations in the outer area of the system, and expanding distances between those close to the center.

Some systems assign unique alphanumeric codes to each of their stations to help commuters identify them, which briefly encodes information about the line it is on, and its position on the line. For example, on the Singapore MRT, Changi Airport MRT station has the alphanumeric code CG2, indicating its position as the 2nd station on the Changi Airport branch of the East West Line. Interchange stations would have at least two codes, for example, Raffles Place MRT station has two codes, NS26 and EW14, the 26th station on the North South Line and the 14th station on the East West Line. Seoul Metro is another example that utilizes a code for its stations. But unlike that of Singapore's MRT, it is mostly numbers. Based on the line number, for example Sinyongsan station, coded as station 429. As it is on Line 4, the first number of the station code is 4. The last 2 numbers will be the station number on that line. Interchange stations can have multiple codes. Like City Hall station in Seoul which is served by Line 1 and Line 2. It has a code of 132 and 201 respectively. The Line 2 is a circle line and the first stop is City Hall, therefore, City Hall has the station code of 201. For lines without a number like Bundang line it will have an alphanumeric code. Lines without a number that are operated by KORAIL will start with the letter 'K'.

With widespread use of the Internet and cell phones globally, transit operators now use these technologies to present information to their users. In addition to online maps and timetables, some transit operators now offer real-time information which allows passengers to know when the next vehicle will arrive, and expected travel times. The standardized GTFS data format for transit information allows many third-party software developers to produce web and smartphone app programs which give passengers customized updates regarding specific transit lines and stations of interest.

Safety and security

Compared to other modes of transport, rapid transit has a good safety record, with few accidents. Rail transport is subject to strict safety regulations, with requirements for procedure and maintenance to minimize risk. Head-on collisions are rare due to use of double track, and low operating speeds reduce the occurrence and severity of rear-end collisions and derailments. Fire is more of a danger underground, such as the King's Cross fire in London in November 1987, which killed 31 people. Systems are generally built to allow evacuation of trains at many places throughout the system.

High platforms (usually over 1 meter / 3 feet) are a safety risk, as people falling onto the tracks have trouble climbing back. Platform screen doors are used on some systems to eliminate this danger.

Rapid transit facilities are public spaces and may suffer from security problems: petty crimes, such as pickpocketing and baggage theft, and more serious violent crimes, as well as sexual assaults on tightly packed trains and platforms. Security measures include video surveillance, security guards, and conductors. In some countries a specialized transit police may be established. These security measures are normally integrated with measures to protect revenue by checking that passengers are not travelling without paying. Some subway systems, such as the Beijing Subway, which is ranked by Worldwide Rapid Transit Data as the "World's Safest Rapid Transit Network" in 2015, incorporate airport-style security checkpoints at every station. Rapid transit systems have been subject to terrorism with many casualties, such as the 1995 Tokyo subway sarin gas attack and the 2005 "7/7" terrorist bombings on the London Underground.

Added features 

Some rapid transport trains have extra features such as wall sockets, cellular reception (typically using leaky feeder in tunnels and DAS antennas in stations), as well as Wi-Fi connectivity. The first metro system in the world to enable full mobile phone reception in underground stations and tunnels was Singapore's Mass Rapid Transit (MRT) system which launched its first underground mobile phone network (using AMPS) in 1989. Nowadays, many metro systems, such as the Hong Kong Mass Transit Railway (MTR) and the Berlin U-Bahn, provide mobile data connections in their tunnels for various network operators.

Infrastructure

The technology used for public, mass rapid transit has undergone significant changes in the years since the Metropolitan Railway opened publicly in London in 1863.

High capacity Monorails with larger and longer trains can be classified as rapid transit systems. Such monorail systems recently started operating in Chongqing and São Paulo. Light metro is a subclass of rapid transit that has the speed and grade separation of a "full metro" but is designed for smaller passenger numbers. It often has smaller loading gauges, lighter train cars and smaller consists of typically two to four cars. Light metros are typically used as feeder lines into the main rapid transit system. For instance, the Wenhu Line of the Taipei Metro serves many relatively sparse neighbourhoods and feeds into and complements the high capacity metro lines.

Some systems have been built from scratch, others are reclaimed from former commuter rail or suburban tramway systems that have been upgraded, and often supplemented with an underground or elevated downtown section. At grade alignments with a dedicated right-of-way are typically used only outside dense areas, since they create a physical barrier in the urban fabric that hinders the flow of people and vehicles across their path and have a larger physical footprint. This method of construction is the cheapest as long as land values are low. It is often used for new systems in areas that are planned to fill up with buildings after the line is built.

Trains

Most rapid transit trains are electric multiple units with lengths from three to over ten cars. Crew sizes have decreased throughout history, with some modern systems now running completely unstaffed trains. Other trains continue to have drivers, even if their only role in normal operation is to open and close the doors of the trains at stations. Power is commonly delivered by a third rail or by overhead wires. The whole London Underground network uses fourth rail and others use the linear motor for propulsion.

Some urban rail lines are built to a loading gauge as large as that of main-line railways; others are built to a smaller one and have tunnels that restrict the size and sometimes the shape of the train compartments. One example is most of the London Underground, which has acquired the informal term "tube train" due to the cylindrical shape of the trains used on the deep tube lines.

In many cities, metro networks consist of lines operating different sizes and types of vehicles. Although these sub networks are not often connected by track, in cases when it is necessary, rolling stock with a smaller loading gauge from one sub network may be transported along other lines that use larger trains. On some networks such operations are part of normal services.

Tracks

Most rapid transit systems use conventional standard gauge railway track. Since tracks in subway tunnels are not exposed to rain, snow, or other forms of precipitation, they are often fixed directly to the floor rather than resting on ballast, such as normal railway tracks. 

An alternate technology, using rubber tires on narrow concrete or steel roll ways, was pioneered on certain lines of the Paris Métro and Mexico City Metro, and the first completely new system to use it was in Montreal, Canada. On most of these networks, additional horizontal wheels are required for guidance, and a conventional track is often provided in case of flat tires and for switching. There are also some rubber-tired systems that use a central guide rail, such as the Sapporo Municipal Subway and the NeoVal system in Rennes, France. Advocates of this system note that it is much quieter than conventional steel-wheeled trains, and allows for greater inclines given the increased traction of the rubber tires. However, they have higher maintenance costs and are less energy efficient. They also lose traction when weather conditions are wet or icy, preventing above-ground use of the Montréal Metro and limiting it on the Sapporo Municipal Subway, but not rubber-tired systems in other cities.

Some cities with steep hills incorporate mountain railway technologies in their metros. One of the lines of the Lyon Metro includes a section of rack (cog) railway, while the Carmelit, in Haifa, is an underground funicular.

For elevated lines, another alternative is the monorail, which can be built either as straddle-beam monorails or as a suspended monorail. While monorails have never gained wide acceptance outside Japan, there are some such as Chongqing Rail Transit's monorail lines which are widely used in a rapid transit setting.

Motive power

Although trains on very early rapid transit systems like the Metropolitan Railway were powered using steam engines, either via cable haulage or steam locomotives, nowadays virtually all metro trains use electric power and are built to run as multiple units. Power for the trains, referred to as traction power, is usually supplied via one of two forms: an overhead line, suspended from poles or towers along the track or from structure or tunnel ceilings, or a third rail mounted at track level and contacted by a sliding "pickup shoe". The practice of sending power through rails on the ground is mainly due to the limited overhead clearance of tunnels, which physically prevents the use of overhead wires. The use of overhead wires allows higher power supply voltages to be used. Although overhead wires are more likely to be used on metro systems without many tunnels, an example of which is the Shanghai Metro, overhead wires are employed on some systems that are predominantly underground, as in Barcelona, Fukuoka, Hong Kong, Madrid, and Shijiazhuang. Both overhead wire and third-rail systems usually use the running rails as the return conductor, but some systems use a separate fourth rail for this purpose. There are transit lines that make use of both rail and overhead power, with vehicles able to switch between the two such as Blue Line in Boston.

Tunnels

Underground tunnels move traffic away from street level, avoiding delays caused by traffic congestion and leaving more land available for buildings and other uses. In areas of high land prices and dense land use, tunnels may be the only economic route for mass transportation. Cut-and-cover tunnels are constructed by digging up city streets, which are then rebuilt over the tunnel; alternatively, tunnel-boring machines can be used to dig deep-bore tunnels that lie further down in bedrock.

The construction of an underground metro is an expensive project and is often carried out over a number of years. There are several different methods of building underground lines.

In one common method, known as cut-and-cover the city streets are excavated and a tunnel structure strong enough to support the road above is built in the trench, which is then filled in and the roadway rebuilt. This method often involves extensive relocation of utilities commonly buried not far below street level – particularly power and telephone wiring, water and gas mains, and sewers. This relocation must be done carefully, as according to documentaries from the National Geographic Society, one of the causes of the April 22, 1992, explosions in Guadalajara was a mislocated water pipeline. The structures are typically made of concrete, perhaps with structural columns of steel; in the oldest systems, brick, and cast iron were used. Cut-and-cover construction can take so long that it is often necessary to build a temporary roadbed while construction is going on underneath, in order to avoid closing main streets for long periods of time.

Another usual type of tunneling method is called bored tunneling. Here, construction starts with a vertical shaft from which tunnels are horizontally dug, often with a tunneling shield, thus avoiding almost any disturbance to existing streets, buildings, and utilities. But problems with ground water are more likely, and tunneling through native bedrock may require blasting. The first city to extensively use deep tunneling was London, where a thick sedimentary layer of clay largely avoids both problems. The confined space in the tunnel also limits the machinery that can be used, but specialized tunnel-boring machines are now available to overcome this challenge.
One disadvantage with this, however, is that the cost of tunneling is much higher than building cut-and-cover systems, at-grade or elevated. Early tunneling machines could not make tunnels large enough for conventional railway equipment, necessitating special low, round trains, such as are still used by most of the London Underground, which cannot install air conditioning on most of its lines because the amount of empty space between the trains and tunnel walls is so small. Other lines were built with cut-and-cover and have since been equipped with air-conditioned trains.

Above that level, the soil mostly consists of water-bearing finely dispersed sand. Because of this, only three stations out of nearly 60 are built near ground level and three more above the ground. Usually, the vertical distance between the ground level and the rail is used to represent the depth. Among the possible candidates are:

 Deepest stations :

 Arsenalna station in Kyiv Metro, Ukraine (opened 1960, built under a hill)
 Admiralteyskaya (The Admiralty, opened 2011, probably the best candidate)
Hongtudi station in Chongqing Metro, China (opened in 2016)
Liyuchi station in Chongqing Metro, China (opened in 2017)
 Park Pobedy station in Moscow (~, opened 2005, built under a hill)
 Puhung station in Pyongyang Metro, North Korea (which doubles as a nuclear shelter)
 Washington Park MAX Light Rail station in Portland, Oregon (built under a hill), 260 feet (80 m)

One advantage of deep tunnels is that they can dip in a basin-like profile between stations, without incurring the significant extra costs associated with digging near ground level. This technique, also referred to as putting stations "on humps", allows gravity to assist the trains as they accelerate from one station and brake at the next. It was used as early as 1890 on parts of the City and South London Railway and has been used many times since, particularly in Montreal.

They have several entrances/exits equipped with high-speed lifts, instead of escalators. These kinds of exits have existed in many London Underground stations and stations in former Soviet Union nations.

Elevated railways
Elevated railways are a cheaper and easier way to build an exclusive right-of-way without digging expensive tunnels or creating barriers. In addition to street level railways they may also be the only other feasible alternative due to considerations such as a high water table close to the city surface that raises the cost of, or even precludes underground railways (e.g. Miami). Elevated guideways were popular around the beginning of the 20th century, but fell out of favor; they came back into fashion in the last quarter of the century—often in combination with driverless systems, for instance Vancouver's SkyTrain, London's Docklands Light Railway, the Miami Metrorail, and the Bangkok Skytrain.

Stations

Stations function as hubs to allow passengers to board and disembark from trains. They are also payment checkpoints and allow passengers to transfer between modes of transport, for instance to buses or other trains. Access is provided via either island- or side platforms. Underground stations, especially deep-level ones, increase the overall transport time: long escalator rides to the platforms mean that the stations can become bottlenecks if not adequately built. Some underground and elevated stations are integrated into vast underground or skyway networks respectively, that connect to nearby commercial buildings. In suburbs, there may be a "park and ride" connected to the station.

To allow easy access to the trains, the platform height allows step-free access between platform and train. If the station complies with accessibility standards, it allows both disabled people and those with wheeled baggage easy access to the trains, though if the track is curved there can be a gap between the train and platform. Some stations use platform screen doors to increase safety by preventing people falling onto the tracks, as well as reducing ventilation costs.

The deepest station in the world is Arsenalna station in Kyiv, Ukraine (105.5 m).

Particularly in the former Soviet Union and other Eastern European countries, but to an increasing extent elsewhere, the stations were built with splendid decorations such as marble walls, polished granite floors and mosaics—thus exposing the public to art in their everyday life, outside galleries and museums. The systems in Moscow, St. Petersburg, Tashkent and Kyiv are widely regarded as some of the most beautiful in the world. Several other cities such as London, Stockholm, Montreal, Lisbon, Naples and Los Angeles have also focused on art, which may range from decorative wall claddings, to large, flamboyant artistic schemes integrated with station architecture, to displays of ancient artifacts recovered during station construction. It may be possible to profit by attracting more passengers by spending relatively small amounts on grand architecture, art, cleanliness, accessibility, lighting and a feeling of safety.

Crew size and automation

In the early days of underground railways, at least two staff members were needed to operate each train: one or more attendants (also called "conductor" or "guard") to operate the doors or gates, as well as a driver (also called the "engineer" or "motorman"). The introduction of powered doors around 1920 permitted crew sizes to be reduced, and trains in many cities are now operated by a single person. Where the operator would not be able to see the whole side of the train to tell whether the doors can be safely closed, mirrors or closed-circuit TV monitors are often provided for that purpose.

A replacement system for human drivers became available in the 1960s, with the advancement of computerized technologies for automatic train control and, later, automatic train operation (ATO). ATO could start a train, accelerate to the correct speed, and stop automatically in the correct position at the railway platform at the next station, while taking into account the information that a human driver would obtain from lineside or cab signals. The first metro line to use this technology in its entirety was London's Victoria line, opened in 1968. In normal operation, a crew member sits in the driver's position at the front, but is only responsible for closing the doors at each station. By pressing two "start" buttons the train would then move automatically to the next station. This style of "semi-automatic train operation" (STO), known technically as "Grade of Automation (GoA) 2", has become widespread, especially on newly built lines like the San Francisco Bay Area's BART network.

A variant of ATO, "driverless train operation" (DTO) or technically "GoA 3", is seen on some systems, as in London's Docklands Light Railway, which opened in 1987. Here, a "passenger service agent" (formerly called "train captain") would ride with the passengers rather than sit at the front as a driver would, but would have the same responsibilities as a driver in a GoA 2 system. This technology could allow trains to operate completely automatically with no crew, just as most elevators do. When the initially increasing costs for automation began to decrease, this became a financially attractive option for employers. At the same time, countervailing arguments stated that in an emergency situation, a crew member on board the train would have possibly been able to prevent the emergency in the first place, drive a partially failed train to the next station, assist with an evacuation if needed, or call for the correct emergency services and help direct them to the location where the emergency occurred. In some cities, the same reasons are used to justify a crew of two rather than one; one person drives from the front of the train, while the other operates the doors from a position farther back, and is more conveniently able to assist passengers in the rear cars. An example of the presence of a driver purely due to union opposition is the Scarborough RT line in Toronto.

Completely unstaffed trains, or "unattended train operation" (UTO) or technically "GoA 4", are more accepted on newer systems where there are no existing crews to be displaced, and especially on light metro lines. One of the first such systems was the VAL (véhicule automatique léger or "automated light vehicle"), first used in 1983 on the Lille Metro in France. Additional VAL lines have been built in other cities such as Toulouse, France, and Turin, Italy. Another system that uses unstaffed trains is Bombardier's Innovia Metro, originally developed by the Urban Transportation Development Corporation as the Intermediate Capacity Transit System (ICTS). It was later used on the SkyTrain in Vancouver and the Kelana Jaya Line in Kuala Lumpur, both which carries no crew members. 

Systems that use automatic trains also commonly employ full-height platform screen doors or half-height automatic platform gates in order to improve safety and ensure passenger confidence, but this is not universal, as networks like Nuremberg do not, using infrared sensors instead to detect obstacles on the track. Conversely, some lines which retain drivers or manual train operation nevertheless use PSDs, notably London's Jubilee Line Extension. The first network to install PSDs on an already operational system was Hong Kong's MTR, followed by the Singapore MRT. 

As for larger trains, the Paris Métro has human drivers on most lines but runs automated trains on its newest line, Line 14, which opened in 1998. The older Line 1 was subsequently converted to unattended operation by 2012, and it is expected that Line 4 will follow by 2023. The North East MRT line in Singapore, which opened in 2003, is the world's first fully automated underground urban heavy-rail line. The MTR Disneyland Resort line is also automated, along with trains on the South Island line.

Modal tradeoffs and interconnections

Since the 1980s, trams have incorporated several features of rapid transit: light rail systems (trams) run on their own rights-of-way, thus avoiding congestion; they remain on the same level as buses and cars. Some light rail systems have elevated or underground sections. Both new and upgraded tram systems allow faster speed and higher capacity, and are a cheap alternative to construction of rapid transit, especially in smaller cities.

A premetro design means that an underground rapid transit system is built in the city center, but only a light rail or tram system in the suburbs. Conversely, other cities have opted to build a full metro in the suburbs, but run trams in city streets to save the cost of expensive tunnels. In North America, interurbans were constructed as street-running suburban trams, without the grade-separation of rapid transit. Premetros also allow a gradual upgrade of existing tramways to rapid transit, thus spreading the investment costs over time. They are most common in Germany with the name Stadtbahn.

Suburban commuter rail is a heavy rail system that operates at a lower frequency than urban rapid transit, with higher average speeds, often only serving one station in each village and town. Commuter rail systems of some cities (such as German S-Bahns, Jakarta's KRL Commuterline, Chennai Suburban, Australian suburban networks, Danish S-tog etc.) can be seen as the substitute for the city's rapid transit system providing frequent mass transit within city. In contrast, the mainly urban rapid transit systems in some cities (such as the Dubai Metro, Shanghai Metro, MetroSur of the Madrid Metro, Taipei Metro, Kuala Lumpur Rapid Transit etc.) have lines that fan out to reach the outer suburbs. With some other urban or "near urban" rapid transit systems (Guangfo Metro, Bay Area Rapid Transit, Los Teques Metro and Seoul Subway Line 7, etc.) serving bi- and multi-nucleus agglomerations.

Some cities have opted for two tiers of urban railways: an urban rapid transit system (such as the Paris Métro, Berlin U-Bahn, London Underground, Sydney Metro, Tokyo subway, Jakarta MRT and Philadelphia Subway) and a suburban system (such as their counterparts RER, S-Bahn, Crossrail & London Overground, Sydney Trains, JR Urban Lines, KRL Commuterline and Regional Rail respectively). Such systems are known variously as S-trains, suburban service, or (sometimes) regional rail. The suburban systems may have their own purpose built trackage, run at similar "rapid transit-like" frequencies, and (in many countries) are operated by the national railway company. In some cities these suburban services run through tunnels in the city center and have direct transfers to the rapid transit system, on the same or adjoining platforms. In some cases, such as the London Underground and the London Overground, suburban and rapid transit systems even run on the exact same track along some sections. California's BART, Federal District's Metrô-DF and Washington's Metrorail system is an example of a hybrid of the two: in the suburbs the lines function like a commuter rail line, with longer intervals and longer distance between stations; in the downtown areas, the stations become closer together and many lines interline with intervals dropping to typical rapid transit headways.

Costs, benefits, and impacts

, 212 cities have built rapid transit systems. The capital cost is high, as is the risk of cost overrun and benefit shortfall; public financing is normally required. Rapid transit is sometimes seen as an alternative to an extensive road transport system with many motorways; the rapid transit system allows higher capacity with less land use, less environmental impact, and a lower cost.

Elevated or underground systems in city centers allow the transport of people without occupying expensive land, and permit the city to develop compactly without physical barriers. Motorways often depress nearby residential land values, but proximity to a rapid transit station often triggers commercial and residential growth, with large transit oriented development office and housing blocks being constructed. Also, an efficient transit system can decrease the economic welfare loss caused by the increase of population density in a metropolis.

Rapid transit systems have high fixed costs. Most systems are publicly owned, by either local governments, transit authorities or national governments. Capital investments are often partially or completely financed by taxation, rather than by passenger fares, but must often compete with funding for roads. The transit systems may be operated by the owner or by a private company through a public service obligation. The owners of the systems often also own the connecting bus or rail systems, or are members of the local transport association, allowing for free transfers between modes. Almost all transit systems operate at a deficit, requiring fare revenue, advertising and subsidies to cover costs.

The farebox recovery ratio, a ratio of ticket income to operating costs, is often used to assess operational profitability, with some systems including Hong Kong's MTR Corporation, and Taipei achieving recovery ratios of well over 100%. This ignores both heavy capital costs incurred in building the system, which are often subsidized with soft loans and whose servicing is excluded from calculations of profitability, as well as ancillary revenue such as income from real estate portfolios. Some systems, particularly Hong Kong's, extensions are partly financed by the sale of land whose value has appreciated by the new access the extension has brought to the area, a process known as value capture.

Urban land-use planning policies are essential for the success of rapid transit systems, particularly as mass transit is not feasible in low-density communities. Transportation planners estimate that to support rapid rail services, there must be a residential housing density of twelve dwelling units per acre.

See also

 List of metro systems
 Bus rapid transit
 Megaproject
 Personal rapid transit
 Rapid transit track gauge

References

Citations

Sources 

 
 Bobrick, Benson (1981). Labyrinths of Iron: a[n] History of the World's Subways. New York: Newsweek Books. .

External links 

 UrbanRail

 Databases
 metro data  Database of metro systems around the world

 
Passenger rail transport
Articles containing video clips
1863 introductions